Roos Hall (or sometimes Rose Hall) is a manor house and former manor ½ a mile (¾km) west of Beccles in Suffolk. It is a Grade I listed building.

It is said to be among the most haunted houses in England, and to have the Devil's footprint imprinted on one of its walls. It was owned by the Suckling family in the 17th century having been bought by Sir John Suckling in 1600. On Suckling's death, Roos Hall was inherited by Sir Alexander Temple (Suckling's brother-in-law) in lieu of repayment of a debt, but was later repurchased by the family. It subsequently passed to the Rich family following the marriage between Sir John Suckling's widow and Sir Edwin Rich.

References

Grade I listed houses
Grade I listed buildings in Suffolk
Beccles